Beverly Wills (June 7, 1933 – October 24, 1963) was an American television and film actress.

Biography
She was born in 1933 as Beverly Josephine Williams in Los Angeles to actress and comedian Joan Davis and actor and writer Si Wills. Wills made her film debut in George White's Scandals (1945) when she was age 11. Mickey (1948) followed three years later.

In 1952, at age 18, Wills appeared with her mother and Jim Backus in the TV comedy I Married Joan (1952–1955). She played the younger sister of her real-life mother. After the series ended its run, Wills appeared in four more films, including Some Like It Hot (1959) and Son of Flubber (1963).

Wills married three times before the age of 30. Her first marriage was to Lee Bamber, a Pasadena fireman, in 1952. Bamber and Wills eloped to Carson City, Nevada. The couple divorced in 1953. She later married Alan Grossman on July 12, 1954; the couple had two sons. Wills and Grossman divorced, and she married Martin Colbert.

On October 24, 1963, Wills died in a house fire with her grandmother, Nina Davis, and both children from her second marriage, sons Guy (age 7) and Larry (age 4) Grossman. The fire started due to the 30-year-old Wills smoking in bed. Her mother Joan previously died from a heart attack at age 53 in 1961.

Filmography

References

External links

 

1933 births
1963 deaths
Actresses from Los Angeles
American film actresses
American television actresses
Deaths from fire in the United States
20th-century American actresses
Accidental deaths in California